The United States men's national ice sledge hockey team represents the United States at the IPC World Championships and Paralympic Games. The team is overseen by USA Hockey. The team is one of the most successful in international para ice hockey, having won a record five Paralympic gold medals and a record five World Championship titles.

Para ice hockey
National ice sledge hockey teams